Kutul is a rural locality (a selo) and the administrative centre of Kutulsky Selsoviet, Kurakhsky District, Republic of Dagestan, Russia. The population was 195 as of 2010.

Geography 
Kutul is located 18 km southeast of Kurakh (the district's administrative centre) by road. Ikra and Kabir are the nearest rural localities.

Nationalities 
Lezgins live there.

References 

Rural localities in Kurakhsky District